Edward Towle Brooks,  (July 6, 1830 – August 5, 1897) was a Canadian lawyer, judge, and political figure. He represented Town of Sherbrooke in the House of Commons of Canada from 1872 to 1882 as a Conservative member.

He was born in Lennoxville, Lower Canada, the son of Samuel Brooks and Elizabeth Towle. Brooks was educated at Dartmouth College, studied law with John Sewell Sanborn and was called to the bar in 1854. In 1856, he married Sarah Louise Clarke. Brooks was named Crown Prosecutor for St. Francis district in 1862. He was named Queen's Counsel in 1875. He was elected battonier for the St. Francis bar. Brooks was a trustee for Bishop's College School in Lennoxville. In 1882, he was named puisne judge in the Quebec Superior Court. Brooks retired from the bench in 1895 due to poor health. He died in Sherbrooke two years later.

Electoral record

References 

The Canadian biographical dictionary and portrait gallery of eminent and self-made men ... (1881)
The Canadian men and women of the time a handbook of Canadian biography, HJ Morgan (1898)

1830 births
1897 deaths
Conservative Party of Canada (1867–1942) MPs
Members of the House of Commons of Canada from Quebec
Judges in Quebec
Politicians from Sherbrooke
Dartmouth College alumni
Bishop's College School Faculty
Canadian King's Counsel
Anglophone Quebec people
Canadian people of American descent